U9 is a line on the Berlin U-Bahn. The line was opened on 28 August 1961 as Line G.

Route
The path of the U9 is completely underground. It starts in the north at Osloer Straße in Gesundbrunnen and runs through Wedding before passing under the Berlin Ringbahn and running through Moabit, reaching Hansaplatz and Tiergarten before crossing the Berlin Stadtbahn at the Zoo and Kurfürstendamm, eventually leaving western central Berlin by heading to Friedenau and finally Steglitz at Rathaus Steglitz.

History

First stage of construction
After the division of Berlin in 1948, the citizens of West Berlin preferred buses and trams that bypassed East Berlin. Furthermore, the highly populated boroughs of Steglitz, Wedding and Reinickendorf were in need of rapid transit access to the new center of West Berlin south of the Zoo. This prompted the construction of a completely new line, then called line G, becoming the third north–south line after line C (modern U6) and line D (modern U8).

Groundbreaking took place on 23 June 1955 at Tiergarten. Construction was difficult as it needed to pass under four U-Bahn lines (U1, U2, U3, U6), two S-Bahn lines (Stadtbahn, Ringbahn twice) and three waterways (Spree River, Landwehr Canal, Berlin-Spandau Canal).

Line G from Leopoldplatz to Spichernstraße was planned to open on 2 September 1961. This was pushed up to 28 August 1961 after the construction of the Berlin Wall underscored the necessity of this new line. To accommodate the U9, the Nürnberger Platz station was closed. It was replaced by Spichernstraße (opened 2 June 1959) and Augsburger Straße (opened 8 May 1961) stations respectively.

The new stations include:
Leopoldplatz (today: U6)
Amrumer Straße
Putlitzstraße (today: Westhafen; S-Bahn /Ringbahn)
Birkenstraße
Turmstraße
Hansaplatz
Zoologischer Garten (heute: U2; S-Bahn /Stadtbahn)
Kurfürstendamm (today: U1)
Spichernstraße (today: U3)

It will also interchange with the smaller profile station, but it was opened on the same day as U9 was opened:
Kurfürstendamm

Second stage
Since the subsidies from the Federal Republic still went to West Berlin, was further built on the busy subway. On 29 January 1971, the longest subway extensions was implemented. The U7 takes the lead of the Möckernbrücke to Fehrbelliner Platz, Line 9 of the Spichernstraße to Walther-Schreiber-Platz. Nine kilometers of track with eleven new stations went into operation on that day. Groundbreaking began 1 July 1962. For the Steglitz and Neukölln a fast connection to the western center and no longer had the buses in claim take.

The route follows the U9 from the previous terminus Spichernstraße the Bundesallee and crosses line U7 on Berliner Straße. The lower platform is a central platform, the U9 has here. This however is not in the usual sense: On one side of the platform, climb—at the station Berliner Straße usually on the right side, but on the left side—seen in the direction of travel. It could also be seen as apart Laid central platforms the platforms thus. Only one transition at the north end of both platforms interconnects. This construction project was necessary because the subway construction, a road tunnel between the two side platforms was built.

Similar to the Berliner Straße railway station also encloses the then-newly built Bundesplatz a road tunnel, which is why no central platform was also built here. The tracks split up shortly before the station to bypass the tunnel and there were two side platforms.

All stations were built designed by Rainer G. Rümmler. Here, instead of the current ceramic tiles, large-format colorful fiber cement plates are used, such as the station Walther-Schreiber-Platz. Even should associations by the color scheme is always new are awakened. From Bahnhof Berliner Straße, the colors are white and red on the Coat of arms of Berlin remember, at the station Eisenacher Straße U7 the green faces on the Thuringian Forest at Eisenach. Another reason why the architect is very controversial.

Final extension
Between Walther-Schreiber-Platz station and the Schloßstraße the U9 changes to the tunnel section of U10. In Schloßstraße station itself, the tracks are heading north on the top, in the direction of Rathaus Steglitz on the lower level, however, the offices on the eastern edge of the platform on which was supposed to take the U10. The western edge of the platform is separated by a fence from the passenger traffic. In track trough, unused tracks are laid without power rail. To date, there hangs the sign "No trains". By these enormous constructed provisions, the cost of one meter underground route exorbitantly to 78,000 Mark (adjusted for purchasing power in today's money).

Behind the Schloßstraße ends the U9 at the Rathaus Steglitz. The paths of U9 and U10 here separate again. Both lines should keep in Steglitz at separate stations, viewed from Schloßstraße from an end opening "V" would form. The intended actually for the U9 station Part (Rzo) is equipped with side platforms, located in the minus-1 level until now has been completed only in the shell and is cut off as a storeroom for the civil protection used. The original platform is operated for the U9 instead of planned for the U10 Station part (Rzu) in the minus-2 level.

Background for this management is the intersection of planned U9-line and Wannseebahn immediately south of the station. In the 1970s, it has not been possible, Deutsche Reichsbahn in the negotiations on the railway line to come, the operation of the Steglitz station here an agreement. So as the sweeping system, the BVG considered behind the station for necessary not be created. In the west extending U10 there was not this problem, which is why the U9 has been carried out on the U10 route and provided with a reversing facility. When in January 1984 on the operation went right for the S-Bahn in West Berlin to the BVG, the chance to drive under the S-Bahn, without risking renewed problematic negotiations with the Reichsbahn offered. Since this condition was guaranteed from the perspective of 1984, only ten years (so long was the contract period), the mid-1980s the functionless tunnel was extended through under the railway embankment. A reversing facility or at least one part of it is not built into this piece—this should be done only in a further section of the tunnel.

The section to Rathaus Stegliz was definitely opened on 30 September 1974, its construction began on 7 July 1969.

The addition is from Leopoldplatz to Osloer Straße. It was opened on 30 April 1976, construction began on 6 November 1969. Since this was not feasible but due to the political situation, they let the U9 only to cross Osloer Straße/Swedener Straße construct. They were provided for two new stations: Nauener Platz, Turmstraße, and Osloer Straße. Until then, the U8 can be extended. This resulted in the situation that this tower station could be built without regard to existing underground services. It has also helped build a spacious, bright basement distribution, in which there are several shops and snack bars.

Future extensions

In the old 200 km it was planned to be extended via Filandastraße, Halskestraße, Lankwitz and Lankwitz Kirche, and may be planned to be extended to Lichterfelde Ring via Gallwitzallee, Blankenhainer Straße, Maximilian-Kaller-Straße and Hildburghauser Straße, directly planned to the Berlin external boundary area.

The further northern extension was dropped after the fall of the Berlin Wall in favour of tram line M13. The route was suggested to go via Holzstraße, Wollankstraße and will be divided into two options:
Going to Pankow Kirche, it will be via Rathaus Pankow, Pankow Kirche, Hadlichestraße and towards Quartier am Pankower Tor
Going to Pankow, it will be via Florapromenade, Pankow, Neumannstraße and towards Quartier am Pankower Tor
All of the extensions were abandoned as the patronage is not high enough to justify for these expansions.

References

Berlin U-Bahn lines
Railway lines opened in 1961
1961 establishments in West Germany